Under Article 23 of The Constitution of India, Prohibition is imposed on the practice of Traffic in Human Being and of Forced Labor. It also provides that contravention of said prohibition is an offense under law. The practice of bonded labor was prevalent in 20th century Indian society. Under this system when an elder of an Indian family took a loan (typically and agricultural loan) and fails to repay the same, his or her descendants or dependents have to work for the creditor with interest deducted from their wages until the loan is repaid. Interest structures were typically usurious and interest would often exceeded effective wages earned. This system is commonly known as Bandhua Majdoori (बंधुआ मज़दूरी). Further, because of illiteracy and social backwardness of debtors, several generations are made to work in degradable conditions and extreme poverty under this system. Even after India got independence and Indian Constitution came to power that enshrines the principal of Equality and Dignity, the practice of Bandhua Majdoori (बंधुआ मज़दूरी) continued.

With an aim to end this practice, Indian Parliament enacted Bonded Labor System (Abolition) Act, 1976.

References

Abolitionism in Asia
Debt bondage in India
Acts of the Parliament of India 1976
Slavery in India